The Lightning and the Sun is a 1958 book by Savitri Devi Mukherji, in which the author outlines her philosophy of history along with her critique of the modern world. The book is known for the author's claim that Adolf Hitler was an avatar of the Hindu God Vishnu. It was the first book to espouse esoteric Nazism.

Summary 
In The Lightning and the Sun, Savitri Devi Mukherji attempts to weave Nazism with a cyclic view of history, arguing that time begins with a Golden Age and gradually decays through a Silver Age and Bronze Age into a final Kali Yuga, or Dark Age. She elucidates her concept of "Men in Time," "Men above Time," and "Men against Time" using the lives of Genghis Khan, Akhnaton, and Adolf Hitler respectively. Genghis Khan is used as an example of a "Man in Time" who exhibits Lightning (destructive) qualities and furthers historical decay. Akhnaton is used to illustrate a "Man above Time" who exhibits Sun (creative/life-affirming) qualities and seeks to transcend the process of historical decay. Hitler is used to illustrate a "Man against Time" who exhibits both Lightning and Sun qualities (destructive power harnessed for a life-affirming purpose) and seek to fight historical decay by using violence, Dark-Age methods to achieve a Golden Age state of existence. In the final chapter of the book, Savitri Devi expands further upon her cyclic view of history and argues that at the end of the Dark Age, Kalki will appear and usher in a new Golden Age.

Begun in 1948, completed in 1956, and first published in 1958 in Calcutta, she said it "could be described as a personal answer to the events of 1945 and of the following years." It is dedicated "To the godlike Individual of our times; the Man against Time; the greatest European of all times; both Sun and Lightning: Adolf Hitler, as a tribute of unfailing love and loyalty, for ever and ever." It opens with quotations from The Bhagavad Gita and Rudolf Hess.

Publication
Originally published in 1958 as a self-published samisdat, an abridged version was published by the far-right National Vanguard Books. Resistance Records, a neo-Nazi and white separatist record label, released an audio recording of readings from the book. An unabridged version was also made available online by the Savitri Devi archive. Most recently, an unabridged version was published by the white nationalist Counter-Currents Publishing. 

Ernst Zündel wrote, under his middle name, Christof Friedrich, the preface to the first English language book edition.

References

External links 
 The Lightning and the Sun (HTML)
 The Lightning and the Sun (PDF)

1958 non-fiction books
Antisemitic publications
Books about Nazism
Books by Savitri Devi
English-language books